Jaroslaw Pijarowski (born 18 December 1971) is a Polish avant-garde artist, art curator and founder of Teatr Tworzenia (Theater of Creation). He creates contemporary music, poetry, photography, fine arts and theatre-music spectacles.

Career
He began his art career in 1989, in Bydgoszcz, Poland. He has worked with Andrzej Przybielski, Michael Ogorodov Gong band, Józef Skrzek SBB, Tim Sanford, S. Ciesielski (Republika), Magdalena Abakanowicz, Franciszek Starowieyski, L. Goldyszewicz, E. Srzednicka, B. Raatz (Question Mark), Ł. Wodyński, Xavier Bayle, J. Kamiński, Jorgos Skolias, M. Maciejewski (Variete), (:pl:Marek Piekarczyk) TSA band, Sambor i Paweł Dudziński, (:pl:Wladyslaw Komendarek), J. Marszałek, (:pl:Mariusz Benoit), Adam Ferency, Daniel Olbrychski, Derek Jacobi and many others.

From 2004 he is an honorary curator of Museum of Diplomacy in Poland. From 2016 he is a member of the board of HOMER - The European Medal of Poetry and Art appointed in Brussels. In September 2018 he became a juror at the Interdisciplinary Festival of the Arts "Miasto Gwiazd" (en:"City of Stars") in Żyrardów, and a member of the Artistic Honorary Committee of the above-mentioned festival. From 2018 he is the president of the prize committee World United Creator – Platinum Demiurge Award.

Recent stage and musical-pageantry creations 
Zamek dźwięku (Castle of Sound) (2011), a monumental theatrical and musical spectacle (with J. Skolias, L. Goldyszewicz,  S.Ciesielski, Tim Sanford, Ł. Wodyński and many more)
Terrarium (2012) an avant-garde oratorio with Józef Skrzek, E. Srzednicka and choir
Album Rodzi Inny (2012) with Krzysztof Toczko and many more
Fukushima (2013), a musical performance with E. Srzednicka, S. Ciesielski and many others
Martwa Natura – Live (2013) with W. Komendarek, E. Srzednicka, S. Ciesielski, M. Milczarek, B. Raatz, W. Knade and choir.
 Czasoprzestrzeń – Live Forever (2014) with Józef Skrzek, W. Komendarek, J. Skolias, S. Łobaczewski, Via Musica choir, E. Srzednicka, S. Ciesielski, J. Marszałek and M. Piekarczyk.
 Heaven on Earth – Live in Mózg (2014) with W. Komendarek, J. Skolias, J. Marszałek, A. Dudek-Dürer and L.Goldyszewicz.

Literary works 

Kalendarz Cieni (1989)
Usta spękane treścią (1998)
Wyrok istnienia (1999)
Usta spękane treścią (1998) maintenance release (Arcanusa)
OFF -  (2015) (Arcanus & ICB)
Empyrean Stones of Eagle Wings and Light  (2017) Xichang - China
Polish Poetry Issue  (2019), (Shabdaguchha), USA 
Content Chapped Lips (2019) - Yale Club of New York City - USA -

Radio plays 
Gate 2012/2013 (2012) a radio play with. Adam Ferency, (:pl:Mariusz Benoit), (:pl:Marek Piekarczyk) and many others

Discography 
Z archiwum IPN-u (2011) PRO-VOX
PRO-VOX live (2012) DVD live recording in the Golub Dobrzyń
Terrarium (2013) double album "Terrarium – Live in Bydgoszcz" & "Organ Works" - an avant-garde oratorio with Józef Skrzek and many others
The dream Off Penderecki (2013) with Józef Skrzek, J. Skolias, T. Osiecki, Daniel Olbrychski, Derek Jacobi, choir, and many others
Człowiek z Wysokiego Zamku (album) (2014) with Józef Skrzek, (:pl:Władysław Komendarek) and J. Skolias
 Proteiny (Prawo Ojca) (limited edition – pendrive) with (:pl:Marek Piekarczyk)  (Brain Active Records)
 Requiem dla chwil minionych(2015) with  Józef Skrzek (Brain Active Records)
OFF - Życie bez dotacji (2015)
Katharsis (A Small Victory) (2017)(Brain Active Records)
Living After Life (2019)(Brain Active Records)
 Pandemonicon (2020) (Brain Active Records)

Awards
In 2017 J. Pijarowski received the award of the name of Klemens Janicki-IANICIUS, of the merits of Polish culture.

In 2017 he and Józef Skrzek received the award of the name of Tadeusz Micinski - Feniks.

During The 3rd-International Peace Summit 2019 at Century Park, Sheraton Hotel, Manila, on November 30, 2019 he received from the Paramount Sultan of the Philippines - HH Sultanali Ampaso Umpa nobility title: Prince (Royalty World Peace Advocate).

In 2020 he received "Cross Cultural-Communications 50-th Anniversary Award" in New York City.

Exhibitions and performances  
Czasoprzestrzeń i pochodne (1994), an exposition (photo–installation) with light and sound in Jan Kaja and Jacek Solińskiego Gallery
Namioty Dantego (1995) concert, instalaction, performance (Zamek Książąt Pomorskich – Szczecin (coproduction with P. Badziąg) starring K. Szymanowski, W. Węgrzyn, Marcin Jahr
II Przegląd Fotografii Bydgoskiej (1998) BWA – Bydgoszcz
III Przegląd Fotografii Bydgoskiej (2000) BWA – Bydgoszcz
Exhibition & Sound (2001), a photo exhibition with light and sound in the Alix gallery – Bydgoszcz
IV Przegląd Fotografii Bydgoskiej (2002) BWA – Bydgoszcz
Chwile Obecności -1979 – 2004 (2004) an exhibition to celebrate 25-years of Jan Kaja and Jacek Soliński - Gallery BWA – Bydgoszcz
Przegląd Fotografii Bydgoskiej (2004) BWA – Bydgoszcz
Frozen In Monitoring (2006) performance Hyde Park/Notting Hill – London
Frozen in Monitoring (2006) performance (surroundings of Sex Machines Museum) Prague
AutografExpo and Portrety z autografem (2008) (Muzeum Dyplomacji i Uchodźstwa Polskiego)
Teatr Rysowania part 1 (2010) Fundacja Les Artes – Toruń (with Łukasz Wodyńsk and Xavier Bayle)
sens 9449 – Grupa Dialogu (2010) concert & performanceMCK/Pianola Bydgoszcz
Dźwięki Mowy – Grupa Dialogu (2010) M.Sankowska, K.Kornacka, J.Pijarowski, L.Goldyszewicz and others – Uniwersytet Muzyczny Fryderyka Chopina Warsaw
Dźwięki Mowy - Dźwięk Nowy - Xperyment – Grupa Dialogu (2011) M.Sankowska, K.Kornacka, J.Pijarowski, L.Goldyszewicz and others – Uniwersytet Muzyczny Fryderyka Chopina Warsaw
Teatr Rysowania part 2 (2011) Zakrzewo (with Ł. Wodyński and Xavier Bayle)
Teatr Rysowania part 3-Finał (2011) Centrum Sztuki Współczesnej Toruń (with Ł. Wodyński and Xavier Bayle, featuring B. Raatz- guitar, sitar)
Creativeness – 1971-1991-2011 -? (2011) exhibition, performance – Toruń – retrospective exhibition featuring as J. Pijarowski – L. Goldyszewicz
Salon Fotograficzny 2011 (2011) exhibition – New York City - J. Pijarowski as the guest of honor, Polsko – Amerykański Klub Fotografika & Konsulat RP in New York City
Made In Poland (2011), an exhibition Golub Dobrzyń
PożegnaNieZmózgiem/CISZA - OPENCLOSE Grupa Dialogu & J.Pijarowski, L. Goldyszewicz and others
Pamięci Andrzeja Przybielskiego (2012), a concert (with Teatr Performer) and exhibition – MCK/Pianola Bydgoszcz
Retrospektywa mała (2013) Łomianki
Retrospektywa duża (2013) CBR Warsaw
 Magdalena Abakanowicz//Pijarowski The Art Dimensions (Prologue - Warsaw) (2016) Warsaw
 Pijarowski - dialogues with... - Consulate General of Poland in New York (2017) New York City
 Identity - Culture and art in Pijarowski's works (1997-2017) (2017) – Gallery of Association of Polish Artists and Designers (2017) Gdańsk
 Pijarowski China Tour (2017)
 "Stroll Through Paris", (Xichang Silk Road International Poetry Week) Zhaojue County,
 "Letter to Xichang (W drodze do Xichang Silk Road International Poetry Week)", (Xichang Silk Road International Poetry Week) Xichang, 
 "The Taste of the Word", "The Milky Way of Literature", "The Light" - Lu Xun Academy, Normal University Beijing, (The First International Writing Program) Beijing,  
 "Stroll Through Beijing / Roots Bloody Roots" - Shanghai Writers Assiociation (The First International Writing Program) Shanghai
 "Pijarowski 5B Tour" - performance on Plaça d'Espanya in Barcelona - (August 2018)
 "Pijarowski Saint Tour & Gold Quest part I" - performance Malta  - (January 2019)
 "Pijarowski Saint Tour & Gold Quest part II" - photo sessions  Thailand & photo sessions, performance, lectures Cambodia - (February & March 2019)
 "Multidimensional Room" - Festival Labirynt 2019 - Frankfurt & Słubice (September 2019)
 "Content Chapped Lips - LIGHT" -  J.Pijarowski - voice & Maksymilian Kubis (guitar) - Yale Club of New York City - USA - (November 2019)
 "No More War (Give Peace a Chance - tribute to J. Lennon)" - performance -  Intramuros, Manila - Philippines - (November 2019)
 "The Taste of Poetry & Window of Life " - poetry performance & performance -  Wieliczka, Cracow - Poland - (September 2020)
  „...be a part, be the art. JP in Germany” (Tribute 2 Joseph Beuys) – performance & art meetings – Düsseldorf, Germany – (June, July 2021)
 Concert & Exhibition: J.Pijarowski - Teatr Tworzenia & Friends "Let's Save Our Culture & Art" - April 2022 r. Bydgoszcz, Poland. 
 Performance with Alexandr Rodin in Minsk (July, August 2022)

Virtual reality  
 The Abakanowicz Art Room (2016 - 2017) Warsaw

Artist's books 
 "7-th" of Pijarowski - Seven small porcelain portraits of seven polish artist in one porcelain book (e.g. Krzysztof Penderecki, Adam Makowicz, Janusz Głowacki, Rafał Blechacz) - Museum of Book Art in Poland (Muzeum Książki Artystycznej). 
 Pandemonicon (Artist's book & music cd) 2020

References

External links  
http://www.teatrtworzenia.art.pl
http://www.terrarium.art.pl
https://web.archive.org/web/20160422110629/http://lesartes.cba.pl/
http://www.progrock.org.pl

Polish contemporary artists
Polish performance artists
Polish photographers
Polish musicians
Polish lyricists
Artists from Bydgoszcz
1971 births
Living people